Shi Mei Lin is a teacher of Wu-style t'ai chi ch'uan. She is the adopted daughter of Wu Yinghua and Ma Yueliang

A Wushu and Tai Chi champion in the 1970s and 1980s, she toured with Chinese Wushu teams internationally, including the United States in 1974 when she was part of an elite Chinese Martial Arts Delegation that also included Jet Li (Li Lianjie). She is a graduate from the Beijing Sports and Cultural University in Chinese Martial Arts and was a member of the Shanghai Wushu Team. In later years she coached Wushu in Shanghai and later the Taiwanese Wushu Team in 1994. She is the current head Wushu Taolu coach of the New Zealand Kung Fu Wushu Federation. The NZKWF is New Zealand's representative for Chinese Martial Arts to the International Wushu Federation (IWUF).

Shi Mei Lin often represented Wu-style t'ai chi with Grand Master Ma Yue Liang and Grand Master Wu Ying Hua at martial arts demonstrations, competitions and conferences in China.  She also co-authored the book "Wu Style Tai Chi Fast Form" with Grand Master Ma and Grand Master Wu.

In 1983 Shi Mei Lin demonstrated the Wu-style t'ai chi Fast Form at the All China Traditional Martial Arts competition in Nanchang where she received the Award of Excellence. In 1986 she won the Chinese National Tai Chi sword competition as well as becoming the Wu-style t'ai chi Champion.

In 1988 Shi Mei Lin emigrated to the Netherlands and then later New Zealand where she now lives and teaches Wu-style t'ai chi and Wushu. She also has students in Europe and the United States.

Wu-style t'ai chi was created by a Manchurian named Wu Ch'uan-yu (1834–1902). Wu was a student of Yang Luchan, founder of the Yang style, and Yang Pan-hou. Wu Ch'uan-yu’s son, Wu Chien-ch'uan (1870–1942), studied under the tutorship of his father. After 1912 he developed the teaching of Tai Chi Chuan at the Beijing Sport Research Society, gradually refining his father’s style. His two sons, Wu Gongyi and Wu Gongzao, were his first students.

Wu Chien-ch'uan’s eldest daughter Wu Ying-hua (1907–1996), started studying Tai Chi Chuan with her father at a very young age. In 1935 Wu Ying-hua was also appointed deputy director of the Jian Quan Association in Shanghai. She married her father’s student, Ma Yueh-liang (1901–1998), and throughout her life she taught with her husband all over China. Both Wu Ying Hua and Ma Yueh-liang were very highly regarded in martial arts circles.

References

External links
Shi Mei Lin's Wu-style t'ai chi website
Shi Mei Lin Short demo of Wu-style t'ai chi Sword & Wushu Sword
Shi Mei Lin Short demo of Wu-style Fast Form & Slow form
Wu Ying Hua, Ma Yueh Liang and Shi Mei Lin
T'ai Chi Magazine February 2003 No 1 Editor's notes

Chinese tai chi practitioners
Manchu martial artists
Year of birth missing (living people)
Living people